Richard Fraser Keay (August 9, 1900 – July 1, 1963) was a Canadian politician. He served in the Legislative Assembly of New Brunswick as member of the Liberal party from 1935 to 1948.

References

1900 births
1963 deaths
20th-century Canadian politicians
New Brunswick Liberal Association MLAs
People from Saint Andrews, New Brunswick